Scavenger mRNA-decapping enzyme DcpS is a protein that in humans is encoded by the DCPS gene.

The scavenger mRNA decapping enzymes include Dcp2 and DcpS. DcpS is a scavenger pyrophosphatase that hydrolyses the residual cap structure following 3' to 5' mRNA degradation. DcpS uses cap dinucleotides or capped oligonucleotides as substrates to release m(7)GMP (N7-methyl GMP), while Dcp2 uses capped mRNA as a substrate in order to hydrolyse the cap to release m(7)GDP (N7-methyl GDP). The association of DcpS with 3' to 5' exonuclease exosome components suggests that these two activities are linked and there is a coupled exonucleolytic decay-dependent decapping pathway. The family contains a histidine triad (HIT) sequence in its C-terminal domain, with three histidines separated by hydrophobic residues. The central histidine within the DcpS HIT motif is critical for decapping activity and defines the HIT motif as a new mRNA decapping domain, making DcpS the first member of the HIT family of proteins with a defined biological function.

See also
 Al-Raqad syndrome

References

Further reading

External links 
 PDBe-KB provides an overview of all the structure information available in the PDB for Human m7GpppX diphosphatase (DCPS)

Protein families